Mick Morgan (born ) is an English former professional rugby league footballer who played in the 1960s, 1970s and 1980s, and coached in the 1980s and 1990s.

Background
Mick Morgan's birth was registered in Featherstone, West Riding of Yorkshire, England, and he was a pupil at Normanton Grammar School.

Playing career
Morgan started his career in the junior ranks at Featherstone Rovers before signing his first professional contract at Wakefield Trinity in 1965, he made his début for Wakefield Trinity he played  against Batley at Mount Pleasant, Batley on Friday 1 April 1967, he won caps for England while at Wakefield Trinity in 1975 against France (sub), and Wales, in the 1975 Rugby League World Cup against France (sub), Wales, New Zealand (sub), and Australia, and in 1975 against Papua New Guinea. Morgan won cap(s) for Yorkshire while at Wakefield Trinity, he played  in Wakefield Trinity's 11–22 defeat by Halifax in the 1971–72 Player's No.6 Trophy Final during the 1971–72 season at Odsal Stadium, Bradford on Saturday 22 January 1972, he played , and was captain in Wakefield Trinity's 2–7 defeat by Leeds in the 1973–74 Yorkshire Cup Final during the 1973–74 season at Headingley, Leeds on Saturday 20 October 1973, and played , and was captain in the 13–16 defeat by Hull Kingston Rovers in the 1974–75 Yorkshire Cup Final during the 1974–75 season at Headingley, Leeds on Saturday 26 October 1974, his Testimonial match at Wakefield Trinity was the 13–5 victory over Featherstone Rovers at Belle Vue, Wakefield on Thursday 1 January 1976, in 1978 he moved to York for the 1978–79 season. During his time at Oldham he scored one 3-point try and five 4-point tries.

After finishing his playing career, Morgan became a club commentator for Castleford. His colourful commentary is particularly well known for an outburst he made during the 1993–94 Regal Trophy Final between Castleford and Wigan.

Morgan has written his autobiography entitled I Can't Spake in collaboration with Steve Till for publication on 25 January 2018 (Black Tree Publishers).

References

External links
Mick Morgan Memory Box Search at archive.castigersheritage.com

1950 births
Living people
Carlisle RLFC coaches
Carlisle RLFC players
Castleford Tigers coaches
Castleford Tigers players
England national rugby league team players
English rugby league coaches
English rugby league players
Featherstone Rovers players
Oldham R.L.F.C. players
Rugby league hookers
Rugby league locks
Rugby league props
Rugby league players from Featherstone
Wakefield Trinity players
York Wasps players
Yorkshire rugby league team players